The 1957 McNeese State Cowboys football team was an American football team that represented McNeese State College (now known as McNeese State University) as a member of the Gulf States Conference (GSC) during the 1957 NCAA College Division football season. In their first year under head coach Les DeVall, the team compiled an overall record of 8–2 with a mark of 4–1 in conference play, and finished as GSC co-champion.

Schedule

References

McNeese State
McNeese Cowboys football seasons
McNeese State Cowboys football